Adam Mansbach (born July 1, 1976) is an American author. He has previously been a visiting professor of literature at Rutgers University-Camden, with their New Voices Visiting Writers program (2009–2011).

Biography 
Mansbach graduated from Columbia College in 1998 and received a MFA from Columbia University School of the Arts in 2000.

Mansbach wrote the "children's book for adults" Go the Fuck to Sleep, parodying bedtime stories.  Other books Mansbach has written include Angry Black White Boy, a San Francisco Chronicle Best Book of 2005, and The End of the Jews (for which he won the California Book Award for fiction in 2008). Mansbach was the founding editor of the 1990s hip-hop journal Elementary.

His book Stay the Fuck at Home (2020), was written to support awareness of coronavirus self-isolation measures; it has yet to be formally published. The book was read on Jimmy Kimmel Live by actor Samuel L. Jackson.

He lives in Berkeley, California and co-hosts a radio show, "Father Figures".

Bibliography

Novels
Shackling Water (2003)
Angry Black White Boy, Three Rivers Press/Random House (2005)
The End of the Jews (2009)
Rage is Back, Viking/Penguin (2013)
The Dead Run, William Morrow/HarperCollins (2013)

Poetry
genius b-boy cynics getting weeded in the garden of delights (2001)

 I Had A Brother Once (2021)

Humor
Go the Fuck to Sleep (2011)
Seriously, Just Go To Sleep (2012)
You Have to Fucking Eat (2014) 
Seriously, You Have to Eat (2015)
Fuck, Now There Are Two of You (2019)
A Field Guide to the Jewish People, with Alan Zweibel and Dave Barry (2019)

Anthology contributions
All The Words Past The Margins, in Born to Use Mics: Reading Nas's Illmatic. Edited by Michael Eric Dyson and Sohail Daulatzai (Basic Civitas Books, 2010)

Screenplay
Barry (2016)

Graphic novel 
 Nature Of The Beast: A Graphic Novel Written with Douglas Mcgowan; illustrated by Owen Brozman (2012)

References

External links

 - A Salon article by Mansbach.
 - A Salon article by Mansbach.
 - A political ad Mansbach wrote in the style of Go the Fuck to Sleep, performed by Samuel L. Jackson.

1976 births
Living people
20th-century American male writers
20th-century American novelists
21st-century American male writers
21st-century American novelists
American male novelists
American parodists
Parody novelists
Columbia College (New York) alumni
Novelists from New Jersey
Rutgers University faculty
Writers from Berkeley, California